East of Ludgate Hill is a 1937 British drama film directed by Manning Haynes and starring Hal Gordon, Aubrey Mallalieu and Nancy O'Neil. It was a quota quickie made at Wembley Studios by the British subsidiary of 20th Century Fox.

Cast
 Hal Gordon 
 Aubrey Mallalieu 
 Robert Cochran 
 Nancy O'Neil
 Eliot Makeham

References

Bibliography
 Low, Rachael. Filmmaking in 1930s Britain. George Allen & Unwin, 1985.
 Wood, Linda. British Films, 1927-1939. British Film Institute, 1986.

External links

1937 films
British drama films
1937 drama films
Films shot at Wembley Studios
Films directed by H. Manning Haynes
Films set in London
Quota quickies
20th Century Fox films
British black-and-white films
1930s English-language films
1930s British films